Min Byung-dae (Hangul: 민병대, Hanja: 閔丙大; 20 February 1918 – 4 January 1983) was a South Korean football defender who played for the South Korea in the 1948 Summer Olympics and the 1954 FIFA World Cup.

References

External links
 

1918 births
South Korean footballers
South Korea international footballers
Dual internationalists (football)
Association football defenders
1954 FIFA World Cup players
1983 deaths
Asian Games medalists in football
Footballers at the 1954 Asian Games
Medalists at the 1954 Asian Games
Asian Games silver medalists for South Korea
Olympic footballers of South Korea
Footballers at the 1948 Summer Olympics